This is a round-up of all the latest in the 2007 Dublin Senior Football Championship which began on 18 April 2007 when Garda took on champions UCD at Parnell Park. UCD had finished the 2006 championship by beating St Vincents in the final. St Vincents managed to better their 2006 performance by beating St Brigids in the final at Parnell Park.

Round 1 
St Sylvesters were the first team to qualify for the second round as Erins Hope failed to field a team for the game. Defending champions UCD began their title race with a one-sided victory over Garda. St Judes beat Ballymun Kickhams convincingly and went on to the second round. Naomh Maur defeated O'Tooles sending them straight to the backdoor round and Naomh Mearnóg defeated their Fingal rivals Fingallians with Cillian O'Driscoll scoring a total of five frees for Mearnóg. Ballyboden will hope to do better than their fourth round appearance in 2006 as they cruised past Trinity Gaels. Raheny defeated Parnells despite a late attempt by the opposition. St Marys beat Whitehall Colmcille with a late goal by substitute Kenneth Kelly. Former Sligo forward T Brennan impressed with seven points in Lucan Sarsfields four point win over St Annes. Na Fianna had a comfortable five point win over St Marks and St Brigids crushed a lacklustre Round Towers. Kilmacud Crokes beat St Vincents by two goals in what proved to be a disappointing game between two of Dublins highest rated teams. Plunkett's forward line proved too hot to handle for a gutsy Olaf's with solid performances from Alan Brogan and Jason Sherlock. Last years Intermediate champions St Peregrines lost their first senior game to Naomh Barróg. Ballinteer St Johns cruised into the second round with a victory over Clontarf. Thomas Davis went on to play in the backdoor round against St Vincents as they lost to Erins Isle who progress to the next stage.

Structure 
The winners of their respective first-round games went on to qualify for the second round, the losers were given a second chance in a backdoor system which gave them a place in the third round when they won their backdoor tie.

Fixtures

Backdoor 
O'Tooles were the first team to be knocked of the Dublin Senior Football Championship and will now enter the relegation playoffs. Round Towers went on to qualify for the third round where they would meet one of the losers from the second round. Dublin AFL Division 1 champions Thomas Davis were knocked out of the Dublin championship by St Vincents who progressed to the third round.

Structure 
All of the losing teams from round one face each other in the backdoor round. The losers of these backdoor games are knocked out of the championship and go on to play in the relegation playoffs. The winning teams go on to qualify for the third round which also includes the losers of the second round games.

Fixtures

Round 2 
The first team to go on to the fourth round were Ballyboden St Endas with an easy victory Naomh Mearnóg who join St Marks in the third round. Kilmacud Crokes sent St Sylvesters into the third round in a one sided game with a Ray Cosgrove scoring an impressive 2-03. Na Fianna sent Lucan Sarsfields into the third round with solid performances from Dublin hurlers Tomás Brady and Joey Boland. Erins Isle had a surprise one sided win over Naomh Maur which sends them into the fourth round of the Dublin Championship. Last year's champions had a tight game against St Marys, Saggart which resulted in UCD eventually winning the game by one point. St Judes  had a comfortable win over Raheny to take them on to the fourth round with a strong performance by K McMenamin. It took a late goal from David Matthews to give Plunketts a two-point win over northside rivals St Brigids. Ballinteer progress despite a late comeback attempt by Naomh Barróg.

Structure 
All teams who won in the first round were drawn against each other in the second round. The winning teams from this round go on to qualify for the fourth round of the Dublin championship. The losing teams go on to play in the third round against the winners of the backdoor round.

Fixtures

Round three

Structure 
This round was restricted by a rule that did not allow two clubs who had met earlier in the championship to meet again. Therefore, there was no chance given for a repeat of a previous encounter. Round 3 consisted of 16 teams, comprising the eight losers from Round 2 plus the eight winners from the backdoor system. So, it comprised eight games and eight of the winners progressed to the fourth round. All of the losing teams from round three were eliminated from the Dublin championship but had successfully retained their senior status for 2008 competition.

Fixtures 
St Marks were the only team to qualify for the third round after only playing one game, due to the withdrawal of Erins Hope from the previous backdoor round. Trinity Gaels, Naomh Maur, Lucan Sarsfields, Naomh Mearnóg, Raheny, Naomh Barróg, St Sylvesters  and Fingallians were knocked out at the third round stage. St Marks, St Marys, Saggart, Whitehall Colmcille, Round Towers, Clondalkin, Ballymun Kickhams, St Vincents, Parnells and St Brigids progressed to the fourth round.

Relegation Round

Round Four

Structure 
The fourth round will feature eight matches between the final sixteen teams left in the championship. The round will comprise the eight winners from round two and the eight winners from round 3. The winners of the second round were drawn against the third-round winners; they were separated by two distinct lots meaning the second-round winners were kept apart from third-round winners in the fourth-round draw. The eight winners progress to quarter-finals of the Dublin Senior Football Championship. The eight losers were knocked out of the 2007 competition, to return in the Dublin championship. The fourth round was drawn on July 30, with times and date to be decided based on Dublin's progress in the 2007 All-Ireland Senior Football Championship.

Fixtures 
The Dublin senior football champions maintained their 2006 form by beating Round Towers of Clondalkin to set up a quarter final clash with St Brigids who beat Erins Isle by six points.

Quarter and Semi-finals

Fixtures

Last Eight Layout

Dublin Senior Football final

References

Dublin Senior Football Championship
Dublin Senior Football Championship